The 2016 Montana gubernatorial election took place on November 8, 2016, to elect the Governor and Lieutenant Governor of Montana, concurrently with the 2016 U.S. presidential election, as well as elections to the United States Senate and elections to the United States House of Representatives and various state and local elections.

Incumbent Democratic Governor Steve Bullock won re-election to a second term in office with 50.3% of the vote, defeating Republican challenger Greg Gianforte. Less than a year later, Gianforte won a seat in the U.S. House of Representatives, and in 2020 was elected governor.

In the concurrent presidential election, Democrat Hillary Clinton lost Montana by more than 20%, with Bullock thus over-performing her vote share by more than 14% and her margin of defeat by more than 24%.

Democratic primary

Candidates

Declared
 Steve Bullock, incumbent governor
Running mate: Mike Cooney, incumbent lieutenant governor
 Bill McChesney, former state representative
Running mate: Mike Anderson

Results

Republican primary

Candidates

Declared
 Greg Gianforte, founder of RightNow Technologies and conservative activist
Running mate: Lesley Robinson, Phillips County Commissioner
 Terry Nelson, planning administrator for Ravalli County, Montana
Running mate: Niki Sardot

Withdrawn
 Brad Johnson, chairman of the Montana Public Service Commission and former secretary of state of Montana
 Mark Perea, businessman and nominee for the state senate in 2012 (did not file)

Declined
 Tim Fox, Attorney General of Montana (running for re-election)
 Ryan Zinke, U.S. Representative (running for re-election)
 Taylor Brown, state senator
 Jeff Essman, state representative and former president of the State Senate

Endorsements

Results

Third parties

Independent

Declared
 Christopher Zarcone

Libertarian

Declared
 Ted Dunlap, perennial candidate
Running mate: Ron Vandevender, perennial candidate

Withdrew
 Ron Vandevender, perennial candidate

General election

Debates
Complete video of debate, September 19, 2016 - C-SPAN

Endorsements

Predictions

Polling 
{| class="wikitable" style="font-size:90%;"
|- valign= bottom
! Poll source
! Date(s)administered
! Samplesize
! Margin oferror
! style="width:100px;"| SteveBullock (D)
! style="width:100px;"| GregGianforte (R)
! style="width:100px;"| TedDunlap (L)
! Undecided
|-
| SurveyMonkey
| align=center| November 1–7, 2016
| align=center| 449
| align=center| ± 4.6%
| align=center| 44%
|  align=center| 46%
| align=center| 7%
| align=center| 3%
|-
| SurveyMonkey
| align=center| October 31–November 6, 2016
| align=center| 410
| align=center| ± 4.6%
|  align=center| 45%
| align=center| 44%
| align=center| 8%
| align=center| 3%
|-
| SurveyMonkey
| align=center| October 28–November 3, 2016
| align=center| 403
| align=center| ± 4.6%
| align=center| 46%
| align=center| 46%
| align=center| 7%
| align=center| 1%
|-
| SurveyMonkey
| align=center| October 27–November 2, 2016
| align=center| 376
| align=center| ± 4.6%
|  align=center| 48%
| align=center| 43%
| align=center| 7%
| align=center| 2%
|-
| SurveyMonkey
| align=center| October 26–November 1, 2016
| align=center| 385
| align=center| ± 4.6%
|  align=center| 51%
| align=center| 41%
| align=center| 7%
| align=center| 1%
|-
| SurveyMonkey
| align=center| October 25–31, 2016
| align=center| 405
| align=center| ± 4.6%
|  align=center| 53%
| align=center| 39%
| align=center| 7%
| align=center| 1%
|-
| Mason-Dixon
| align=center| October 10–12, 2016
| align=center| 1,003
| align=center| ± 3.2%
|  align=center| 47%
| align=center| 45%
| align=center| 2%
| align=center| 6%
|-
| Montana State University Billings
| align=center| October 3–10, 2016
| align=center| 590
| align=center| ± 4.0%
|  align=center| 44%
| align=center| 32%
| align=center| 3%
| align=center| 20%
|-

with Ryan Zinke

with Tim Fox

Results

References

External links
Official campaign websites (Archived)
Steve Bullock (D) for Governor
Greg Gianforte (R) for Governor
Ron Vandevender (L) for Governor

2016
Montana
2016 Montana elections
Steve Bullock (American politician)